Davinder Singh is a former Indian hockey player. He was part of the Indian hockey team that won the gold medal in the 1980 Summer Olympics.

References

External links 

 
 

Field hockey players from Punjab, India
Living people
Olympic field hockey players of India
Olympic gold medalists for India
Field hockey players at the 1980 Summer Olympics
Year of birth missing (living people)
Olympic medalists in field hockey
Indian male field hockey players
Medalists at the 1980 Summer Olympics